This is a list of sovereign states in the 1970s, giving an overview of states around the world during the period between 1 January 1970 and 31 December 1979. It contains 191 entries, arranged alphabetically, with information on the status and recognition of their sovereignty. It includes 166 widely-recognized sovereign states (including 4 associated states that gained full independence, 4 states which were initially unrecognized but then gained full recognition later in the decade, and 1 state which was initially widely-recognized but then lost full recognition later in the decade), 2 constituent republics of another sovereign state that were UN members on their own right, 12 entities which claim an effective sovereignty but are considered de facto dependencies of other powers by the general international community, 4 associated states, and 7 transitional states.

Sovereign states

Other entities
Excluded from the list above are the following noteworthy entities which either were not fully sovereign or did not claim to be independent:
Antarctica as a whole had no government and no permanent population. Seven states claimed portions of Antarctica and five of these had reciprocally recognised one another's claims. These claims, which were regulated by the Antarctic Treaty System, were neither recognised nor disputed by any other signatory state.
  Estonia was occupied and administered by the Soviet Union, but the legality of the annexation was not widely-recognized. The Baltic diplomatic services in the West continued to be recognised as representing the de jure state.
  was occupied and administered by the Soviet Union, but the legality of the annexation was not widely-recognized. The Baltic diplomatic services in the West continued to be recognised as representing the de jure state.
  was occupied and administered by the Soviet Union, but the legality of the annexation was not widely-recognized. The Baltic diplomatic services in the West continued to be recognised as representing the de jure state.
 The Saudi–Iraqi neutral zone was a strip of neutral territory between Iraq and Saudi Arabia.
  The Sovereign Military Order of Malta was an entity claiming sovereignty. The order had bi-lateral diplomatic relations with a large number of states, but had no territory other than extraterritorial areas within Rome. The order's Constitution stated: "The Order is a subject of international law and exercises sovereign functions." Although the order frequently asserted its sovereignty, it did not claim to be a sovereign state. It lacked a defined territory. Since all its members were citizens of other states, almost all of them lived in their native countries, and those who resided in the order's extraterritorial properties in Rome did so only in connection with their official duties, the order lacked the characteristic of having a permanent population.
  West Berlin was a political enclave that was closely aligned with, but not actually a part of, West Germany. It consisted of three occupied sectors administered by the United States, the United Kingdom, and France.

See also
List of sovereign states by year
List of state leaders in 1970
List of state leaders in 1971
List of state leaders in 1972
List of state leaders in 1973
List of state leaders in 1974
List of state leaders in 1975
List of state leaders in 1976
List of state leaders in 1977
List of state leaders in 1978
List of state leaders in 1979

Notes

References

1970-1979
1970s politics-related lists
1970 in international relations
1971 in international relations
1972 in international relations
1973 in international relations
1974 in international relations
1975 in international relations
1976 in international relations
1977 in international relations
1978 in international relations
1979 in international relations